Marie Elisabeth Jean Elmes (5 May 1908 – 9 March 2002) was an Irish aid worker credited with saving the lives of at least 200 Jewish children at various times during the Holocaust, by hiding them in the boot of her car. In 2015, she became the first and only Irish person honoured as Righteous Among the Nations by the State of Israel, in recognition of her work in the Spanish Civil War and World War II.

Biography

Elmes was born on 5 May 1908 in Cork, Ireland to chemist Edward Elmes and Elizabeth (née Waters). Edward Elmes was originally from Waterford, and moved to Cork after qualifying as a pharmacist, to run a pharmacy on Winthrop Street, while Waters grew up in Cork. She had one brother, John, who later took over the family business. The family were Church of Ireland.

Elmes attended Rochelle School in Cork and then in 1928 enrolled at Trinity College Dublin where she was elected a Scholar, and gained a first in Modern Literature (French and Spanish). In 1935, as a result of her academic achievements, Elmes was awarded a scholarship in International Studies to study at London School of Economics. She received a certificate in International Studies as well as a further scholarship to continue her education in Geneva, Switzerland.

Spanish Civil War
In February 1937, during the Spanish Civil War and after the completion of her studies, Elmes joined the University Ambulance Unit and was sent to a children's hospital in Almeria, Spain. She was appointed in January 1939 by the American Friends Service Committee (AFSC) (a Quaker humanitarian organisation) to run a hospital they were establishing in Alicante. Elmes was evacuated in May 1939 to the AFSC regional HQ in Perpignan, France.

Saving Jewish children
In 1942, the Vichy authorities made it clear that Jewish children were not legally allowed to be exempt from being sent to the concentration camps, as they had been. Elmes, with help from some colleagues, rescued dozens of children, taking them to safe houses or helping them flee the country altogether. Well aware that she was putting herself at risk, Elmes hid many children in the boot of her car and drove them to safe destinations. She aided many others by securing documents, which allowed for them to escape through the undercover network in Vichy France. She was not a Quaker herself, despite sometimes being described as the "head of the Quaker delegation at Perpignan," but worked with local Quaker organisations.

In January (or February) 1943, Elmes was arrested on suspicion of aiding the escape of Jews and was imprisoned in Toulouse, later being moved to Fresnes Prison run by the Gestapo near Paris, where she spent six months.

Personal life
Elmes married Roger Danjou and had two children, Caroline and Patrick. After the war, she continued living in Pyrénées-Orientales (Northern Catalonia) where she had been active, first in Perpignan and then in Canet-en-Roussillon and Sainte-Marie-la-Mer. She died in a nursing home there.

Honours
After the war Elmes was awarded the Legion of Honour (French:Légion d'honneur), the highest civilian award in France at the time, which she refused to accept on the grounds of unwanted attention for what she did. On 23 January 2013, 11 years after her death, having been nominated by one of the children she rescued, she was posthumously recognised by Yad Vashem as Righteous Among the Nations, her children and grandchildren receiving the award on her behalf, and on 30 September 2016, she was posthumously awarded the Trish Murphy Award at the Network Ireland Business Woman of the Year awards in Cork, which was accepted by her nephew, Mark Elmes, on behalf of her family.
On 25 February 2019 it was announced by Cork City Council that a new pedestrian bridge linking Patrick's Quay to Merchant's Quay would be named after Mary Elmes. It was opened to the public on 9 July 2019.

The Mary Elmes Prize in Holocaust Studies distributed by the Holocaust Educational Trust Ireland is named after Elmes.

References

External links
 The Righteous Among the Nations Database - Mary Elmes
 TG4 film Song of Granite to open Galway Film Fleadh 2017
 TG4 Programmes - Mary Elmes - Gairm chun Gnímh (video)
 Righteous Among The Irish : Mary Elmes, by Bairbre Flood, first broadcast on UCC98.3FM at 10:54 am January 22, 2020 (46'32") Broadsheet, Podcast

1908 births
2002 deaths
Alumni of the London School of Economics
Alumni of Trinity College Dublin
Christian Righteous Among the Nations
Irish Anglicans
Irish diaspora in Europe
Irish expatriates in Spain
Irish emigrants to France
Irish humanitarians
Irish people of the Spanish Civil War
Irish people of World War II
Irish women in business
People from County Cork
People who rescued Jews during the Holocaust
Scholars of Trinity College Dublin
Women in World War II
20th-century Irish women
20th-century Irish businesspeople